Gresa Haziri (born 10 April 1999) is an Albanian footballer who plays as a defender and has appeared for the Albania women's national team.

Career
Haziri has been capped for the Albania national team, appearing for the team during the 2019 FIFA Women's World Cup qualifying cycle.

See also
List of Albania women's international footballers

References

External links
 
 
 

1999 births
Living people
Albanian women's footballers
Albania women's international footballers
Women's association football defenders
KFF Mitrovica players